Walter Burley Griffin Incinerator may refer to:

Walter Burley Griffin Incinerator, Ipswich
Walter Burley Griffin Incinerator, Willoughby